Azim Sirma (Aśăm Śırmi) is a rural locality (a village) in Vurnarsky District of the Chuvash Republic, (Russia). The village is located at 65 kmetres from the capital Cheboksari.

Architecture and monuments 

Our Lady of Assumption church; built in 2005 by the monk Vadim (born Valery Smirnov) and consecrated in 2007. After father's Vadim death, father Alexis Belov was elected abbot of the church.

References

Vurnarsky District

Rural localities in Chuvashia